HFHS may refer to:
 Hales Franciscan High School, Chicago, Illinois, United States
 Henry Ford Health System, Detroit, Michigan, United States
 Henry Ford High School (Detroit, Michigan), United States
 Holy Family High School (disambiguation)